The Anthem to Chiapas is the name of the anthem of the Mexican state of Chiapas. Was officially adopted on December 8, 1913. The lyrics of the state anthem were composed by José Emilio Grajales and the music composed by Miguel Lara Vasallo.

On the proposal of General Bernardo A. Z. Palafox, interim Governor of the State of Chiapas and Chairman of the Organising Board of Guadalupe Fair in Tuxtla Gutierrez, was included in the program of celebrations of the Virgen de Guadalupe the "Union Day of Chiapas" which included a special civic and literary program for each of the Departments in which the state was divided politically, in order to unify after the terrible events between the cities of San Cristobal de las Casas and Tuxtla Gutiérrez by dispute over the seat of the Powers of the State in 1911. In the same program was considered the call for a contest of creation of the Anthem to Chiapas, in order to make a call for peace and unity between the people of Chiapas.

In mid October 1913, was issued the call for the contest of words and music of the Anthem to Chiapas, on 20 November were completed to receive the proposals and the 25th was the winner, unanimously, the "Anthem to Chiapas".

Lyrics

See also 
 Chiapas

References 

Chiapas
Chiapas
Spanish-language songs
1913 songs